Antonio "Tony" Meloto (born January 17, 1950) is the founder of Gawad Kalinga, a Philippine-based poverty alleviation movement.

Meloto was named 2006 "Filipino of the Year" by the Philippine Daily Inquirer.

Early life and career
Antonio Meloto was born on January 17, 1950, in Bacolod, Negros Occidental, to a middle-class family. He took his senior high school year at De Anza High School in Richmond, California, as an American Field Service scholar. He earned a Bachelor of Arts in Economics degree from Ateneo de Manila University, studying as a full academic scholar and graduating in 1971. He then took a job as a purchasing manager for Procter and Gamble.

Couples for Christ and Gawad Kalinga
Meloto became an active member of Couples for Christ in 1985 and quickly rose in leadership, having a key role in establishing CFC Family Ministries in 1993. In 1995 he began a youth development program for juvenile delinquents in Caloocan. The program evolved into Gawad Kalinga, a global movement for building sustainable communities within slum areas.

In 2006 he was awarded the Ramon Magsaysay Award for Community Leadership.

Criticism
In May 2015, Meloto generated controversy for allegedly sexist remarks made at a conference at the University of Hawaii at Manoa.

References

External links
Gawad Kalinga

1950 births
Living people
Filipino philanthropists
People from Bacolod
Ramon Magsaysay Award winners
Ateneo de Manila University alumni
Winners of the Nikkei Asia Prize